Allerton Mauleverer Priory was a medieval monastic house in North Yorkshire, England. The site is in Allerton Mauleverer with Hopperton Parish in the Harrogate District of North Yorkshire.

Richard Mauleverer founded the priory  1100 in the Benedictine order and granted them tithes and lands. The site was granted to the Abbey of Marmoutier in Normandy in 1110 which made it an alien priory.

References

Monasteries in North Yorkshire